Susan (Akin) Crowen (September 1, 1821 – October 7, 1870), was an American author who published under the name, “Mrs. T.J. Crowen.”

Biography 
Susan Akin was born in Rensselaer County, New York, and moved with her family to New York City during her infancy.  She married Thomas J. Crowen, a bookseller and publisher, in 1839, and they had seven daughters and two sons.

She wrote all of her books in the mid-1840s, but her two cookbooks were reprinted through the 1850s and 60s, and there have been reprints in the 21st century.

Bibliography 
 
 
 
 Mrs. Crowen's American lady's cookery book. New York: Dick & Fitzgerald, [1866]

References

External links
 Mrs Crowen's American Lady's Cookbook

1821 births
1870 deaths
19th-century American women writers
19th-century American non-fiction writers
American cookbook writers
American women non-fiction writers
Writers from New York City